Mojave (formerly Mohave) is an unincorporated community in Kern County, California, United States. The town is located in the western region of the Mojave Desert, below and east of Oak Creek Pass and the Tehachapi Mountains. Mojave is on the Pacific Crest Trail.

The population was 4,238 at the 2010 census, up from 3,836 at the 2000 census. Telephone numbers in Mojave follow the format (661) 824-xxxx and the area includes three postal ZIP Codes.

History
The town of Mojave began in 1876 as a construction camp on the Southern Pacific Railroad. It later served as headquarters for construction of the Los Angeles Aqueduct.

Mojave Airport: aviation and military use
Located near Edwards Air Force Base, Naval Air Weapons Station China Lake, and Palmdale Regional Airport, Mojave has a rich aerospace history. Besides being a general-use public airport, Mojave has three main areas of activity: flight testing, space industry development, and aircraft heavy maintenance and storage. The closest airfield to the city, formerly known as the Mojave Airport, is now part of the Mojave Air and Space Port.

The airport consisted of two dirt runways, one of which was oiled, but it lacked any fueling or servicing facilities. In 1941, the Civil Aeronautics Board began improvements to the airport for national defense purposes that included two  asphalt runways and adjacent taxiway. Kern County agreed the airport could be taken over by the military in the event of war.

Following the Japanese attack on Pearl Harbor in December 1941, the U.S. Marine Corps took over the airport and expanded it into Marine Corps Auxiliary Air Station (MCAAS) Mojave. The two existing runways were extended and a third one added. Barracks were constructed to house 2,734 male and 376 female military personnel. Civilian employment at the base would peak at 176. The Marines would eventually spend more than $7 million on the base, which totaled .

Many of the Corps' World War II aces received their gunnery training at Mojave. During World War II, Mojave hosted 29 aircraft squadrons, four Carrier Aircraft Service Detachments, and three Air Warning Squadrons. At its peak, the air station had 145 training and other aircraft. Mojave also had a  swimming pool that was used to train aviators in emergency water egress and for recreation. The base's 900-seat auditorium hosted several USO shows that featured Bob Hope, Frances Langford and Marilyn Maxwell.

With the end of WWII, MCAAS was dis-established on February 7, 1946; a U.S. Navy Air Station was established the same day. The Navy used the airport for drone operations for less than a year, closing it on January 1, 1947. The base remained closed for four years until the outbreak of the Korean War. Mojave was reactivated as an auxiliary landing field to MCAS El Toro. The airport was recommissioned as a MCAAS on December 31, 1953. Squadrons used Mojave for ordnance training when El Toro had bad weather. Marine Corps reserve units were temporarily deployed to Mojave for two week periods. MCAAS Mojave personnel peaked at 400 military and 200 civilians during this period.

In 1961, after the USMC transferred operations to MCAS El Centro, Kern County obtained title to the airport. In February 1972, the East Kern Airport District (EKAD) was formed to administer the airport; EKAD maintains the airport to this day. To a great extent EKAD was the brainchild of Dan Sabovich who heavily lobbied the state for the airport district's creation and ran EKAD until 2002.

During the 1970s, Mojave Airport was served by commuter air carrier Golden West Airlines with scheduled passenger flights operated with de Havilland Canada DHC-6 Twin Otter turboprops direct to Los Angeles (LAX).

Mojave Air and Space Port
On November 20, 2012, the EKAD Board of Directors voted to change the name of the district to the Mojave Air and Space Port. Officials said that the spaceport name is well known around the world, but EKAD is not. The change took effect on January 1, 2013.

The airport is now the home of various aerospace companies and institutions such as Scaled Composites and the civilian National Test Pilot School. The town was home to the Rutan Voyager, the first aircraft to fly around the world nonstop and unrefueled. The airport is also the first inland spaceport in the United States, and was the location of the first private spaceflight, the launch of SpaceShipOne on June 21, 2004.

Mojave also has a Mojave Transportation Museum.

Geography

Climate
It has hot summers and cool winters.

There are an average of 22 days with measurable precipitation. Snow is relatively rare in Mojave, averaging .

Demographics
For statistical purposes, the United States Census Bureau has defined Mojave as a census-designated place (CDP).

2010
The 2010 United States Census reported that Mojave had a population of 4,238. The racial makeup of Mojave was 2,381 (56.2%) White, 638 (15.1%) African American, 54 (1.3%) Native American, 53 (1.3%) Asian, 19 (0.4%) Pacific Islander, 867 (20.5%) from other races, and 226 (5.3%) from two or more races. Hispanic or Latino of any race were 1,592 persons (37.6%).

The 2010 Census reported that 4,238 people (100% of the population) lived in households, 0 (0%) lived in non-institutionalized group quarters, and 0 (0%) were institutionalized.

There were 1,525 households, out of which 614 (40.3%) had children under the age of 18 living in them, 597 (39.1%) were opposite-sex married couples living together, 305 (20.0%) had a female householder with no husband present, 111 (7.3%) had a male householder with no wife present. There were 161 (10.6%) unmarried opposite-sex partnerships, and 9 (0.6%) same-sex married couples or partnerships. 417 households (27.3%) were made up of individuals, and 128 (8.4%) had someone living alone who was 65 years of age or older. The average household size was 2.78. There were 1,013 families (66.4% of all households); the average family size was 3.37.

The population was spread out, with 1,298 people (30.6%) under the age of 18, 509 people (12.0%) aged 18 to 24, 938 people (22.1%) aged 25 to 44, 1,052 people (24.8%) aged 45 to 64, and 441 people (10.4%) who were 65 years of age or older. The median age was 31.0 years. For every 100 females, there were 102.3 males. For every 100 females age 18 and over, there were 96.8 males.

The homeowner vacancy rate was 5.3%; the rental vacancy rate was 13.7%. 1,907 people (45.0% of the population) lived in owner-occupied housing units and 2,331 people (55.0%) lived in rental housing units.

2000
As of the census of 2000, there were 3,836 people, 1,408 households, and 940 families residing in the town. The racial makeup of the town was 67.54% White, 5.58% Black or African American, 1.33% Native American, 2.01% Asian, 0.13% Pacific Islander, 18.12% from other races, and 5.29% from two or more races. 28.31% of the population were Hispanic or Latino of any race.

There were 1,408 households, out of which 37.5% had children under the age of 18 living with them, 43.7% were married couples living together, 16.4% had a female householder with no husband present, and 33.2% were non-families. 27.3% of all households were made up of individuals, and 9.2% had someone living alone who was 65 years of age or older. The average household size was 2.71 and the average family size was 3.31.

In the town 32.5% under the age of 18, 8.8% from 18 to 24, 27.7% from 25 to 44, 20.2% from 45 to 64, and 10.8% who were 65 years of age or older. The median age was 32 years. For every 100 females, there were 103.1 males. For every 100 females age 18 and over, there were 99.2 males.

The median income for a household in the town was $24,761, and the median income for a family was $28,496. Males had a median income of $35,476 versus $19,250 for females. The per capita income for the town was $12,477. About 31.7% of families and 36.2% of the population were below the poverty line, including 48.8% of those under age 18 and 11.7% of those age 65 or over.

In popular culture
In the fictional universe of Star Trek, Mojave in the future has become a bustling metropolis, surrounded by 50 miles of parkland on all sides.
It is the home city of Starfleet captain Christopher Pike.

References

Further reading
 Bailey, Richard C., Kern County Place Names, (Bakersfield, California: Merchant's Printing and Lithography Co., 1967).
 Beck, Warren A. and Ynez D. Haase, "92: Borax Mines and Roads of the Late 1800s," Historical Atlas of California, (Norman, Oklahoma: University of Oklahoma Press, 1974).

External links

 Official website

 
Census-designated places in Kern County, California
Populated places in the Mojave Desert
Populated places established in 1876
1876 establishments in California
Census-designated places in California